S. nivalis may refer to:
 Sagina nivalis, a pearlwort species
 Salix nivalis, a willow species
 Saxifraga nivalis, a saxifrage species